Thetis is a sea nymph in Greek mythology.

Thetis (or Thetys) may also refer to:

Greek Mythology
 Thetis is also the name of a Hesperid.

Astronomy
 17 Thetis, an asteroid
 Thetis Regio on Venus

Places 
 Thetis (island), Crete, Greece
 Thetis Island, British Columbia
 Thetis Lake, British Columbia
 Lake Thetis, Western Australia
 Mount Thetis, Tasmania
 Bahía Thetis, Mitre Peninsula, Tierra del Fuego Province

Ships
 , the name of various British Royal Navy ships
 Thetis-class patrol vessel, a ship class of the Royal Danish Navy 
 HDMS Thetis (F357), the first Royal Danish Navy ship in the Thetis class of ocean patrol vessels
 , a German warship
 Thetis (A 785), a French Navy ship
 Thetis-class gunboat, a gunboat class of the Hellenic Navy
 , a cutter of the United States Coast Guard
 , the name of various United States Navy ships
 , a medium endurance cutter of the United States Coast Guard

Other
 Thetis (decoy), a floating radar decoy used by German submarines during World War II
 Thetis Blacker, English painter and singer
 Mermaid Thetis, an antagonist in the Saint Seiya manga and its sequel
 Thetis, a boss character in Mega Man ZX Advent

See also
 
 Tethys (disambiguation)